Yvonne Catharina Maria Theresia van Rooy (born 4 June 1951) is a retired Dutch politician and diplomat of the Christian Democratic Appeal (CDA) party and businesswoman.

Van Rooy attended a Gymnasium in Maastricht from May 1964 until June 1970 and applied at the Utrecht University in June 1970 majoring in Law and obtaining a Bachelor of Laws degree in July 1972 before graduating with a Master of Laws degree in July 1976. Van Rooy worked as a paralegal for the Christian Employers' association (NCW) from November 1976 until July 1984.

Van Rooy was elected as a Member of the European Parliament after the European Parliament election of 1984, taking office on 24 July 1984. Van Rooy was appointed as State Secretary for Economic Affairs in the Cabinet Lubbers II following the appointment of Enneüs Heerma as State Secretary for Housing, Spatial Planning and the Environment, taking office on 30 October 1986. Van Rooy was elected as a Member of the House of Representatives after the election of 1989, taking office on 14 September 1989. Following the cabinet formation of 1989 Van Rooy was not giving a cabinet post in the new cabinet, the Cabinet Lubbers II was replaced by the Cabinet Lubbers III on 7 November 1989 and she continued to serve in the House of Representatives as a frontbencher and spokesperson for Development Cooperation. Van Rooy was again appointed as State Secretary for Economic Affairs in the Cabinet Lubbers III following the appointment of Piet Bukman as Minister of Agriculture, Nature and Fisheries, taking office on 28 September 1990. After the election of 1994 Van Rooy returned as a Member of the House of Representatives, taking office on 17 May 1994 serving as a frontbencher chairing the parliamentary committee for Kingdom Relations and spokesperson for Social Affairs, Transport and Water Management and Kingdom Relations.

In August 1997 Van Rooy was named as Chairwoman of the Education board of the Tilburg University, she resigned as a Member of the House of Representatives the same day she was installed as Chairwoman on 1 September 1997. In January 2004 Van Rooy was named as Chairwoman of the Education board of the Utrecht University, she resigned as Chairwoman of the Education board of the Tilburg University the same day she was installed as Chairwoman of the Education board of the Utrecht University on 1 February 2004.

Van Rooy also became active in the private sector and public sector and occupied numerous seats as a corporate director and nonprofit director on several boards of directors and supervisory boards (Philips, NN Group, Concertgebouw, Stichting Pensioenfonds Zorg en Welzijn, Gemeentemuseum Den Haag and the Social and Economic Council) and served on several state commissions and councils on behalf of the government (Advisory Council for Spatial Planning, Center for the Promotion of Imports, Accreditation Council and the Dutch Healthcare Authority). Van Rooy also served as a trade association executive for the Nederlandse Vereniging van Ziekenhuizen (Hospitals association; NVZ) serving as Chairwoman from 1 December 2012 until 1 December 2018.

Decorations

References

External links

Official
  Mr. Y.C.M.Th. (Yvonne) van Rooy Parlement & Politiek

 
 

 

1951 births
Living people
Christian Democratic Appeal politicians
Christian Democratic Appeal MEPs
Commanders of the Order of Orange-Nassau
Dutch academic administrators
Dutch chief executives in the healthcare industry
Dutch corporate directors
Dutch nonprofit directors
Dutch nonprofit executives
Dutch Roman Catholics
Dutch trade association executives
Dutch women jurists
Knights of the Holy Sepulchre
Knights of the Order of the Netherlands Lion
Members of the House of Representatives (Netherlands)
Members of the Social and Economic Council
MEPs for the Netherlands 1984–1989
20th-century women MEPs for the Netherlands
People from Eindhoven
People from Tilburg
State Secretaries for Economic Affairs of the Netherlands
Academic staff of Tilburg University
Utrecht University alumni
Academic staff of Utrecht University
20th-century Dutch businesswomen
20th-century Dutch businesspeople
20th-century Dutch politicians
21st-century Dutch businesswomen
21st-century Dutch businesspeople
21st-century Dutch women politicians
21st-century Dutch politicians